Robert Wells may refer to:

 Bob "Hoolihan" Wells (born 1933), American TV personality
 Rob Wells (born 1972), Canadian musician, songwriter and producer
 Robb Wells (born 1971), Canadian actor and screenwriter
 Robby Wells (born 1968), American college football coach
 Kip Wells (Robert Wells, born 1977), American baseball player
 Bob Wells (baseball) (Robert Lee Wells, born 1966), American baseball pitcher
 Robert Wells (boxer) (born 1961), British boxer
 Robert Wells (Canadian politician) (born 1933), lawyer, judge and politician in Newfoundland, Canada
 Robert Wells (composer) (born 1962), Swedish composer, pianist and singer
 Robert Wells (poet) (born 1947), British poet
 Robert Wells (songwriter) (1922–1998), American songwriter, co-wrote The Christmas Song with Mel Tormé
 Robert Joseph Wells (1856–1941), American politician in Minnesota
 Robert William Wells (1795–1864), United States federal judge
See also
Bob Wells (disambiguation)
 Robert Welles, 8th Baron Willoughby de Eresby (died 1470), English baron
 Welles (name)
 Wells (name)